Throne Room is the sixth studio album by American gospel artist CeCe Winans. It was released by Puresprings Gospel and Epic Records on September 9, 2003 in the United States. "Hallelujah Praise" was the only single spawned from the release. After the release of the album, Winans embarked on a 25-city tour with Anointed that had no admission fees.

Background
Winans had talked of a follow-up album to Alabaster Box but delayed in releasing it, upon finally recording the album, Winans stated:

Critical reception

AllMusic called the album "a breathy collection of lushly produced, accessible, unconditionally inspirational pop ballads with the lightest of R&B touches in a style equal parts Enya, Celine Dion, Karyn White, and Leonard Bernstein [...]  The gentle, lulling sound remains constant throughout Throne Room, continuing the soulful gospel vocalist's own legacy."

Track listing
All tracks produced by Cedric and Victor Caldwell; co-produced by CeCe Winans.

Notes
The first 1,000 copies of Throne Room were issued with a DVD that contained exclusive interviews, behind-the-scenes moments, live performances, and the "More Than What I Wanted" music video.

Charts

Certifications

References

CeCe Winans albums
2003 albums
Epic Records albums